Kusumi (written: , , ,  or ) is a Japanese surname. Notable people with the surname include:

, Japanese biologist 
, Japanese footballer
, American professor
, Japanese actor
, Japanese idol, singer, model, actress, voice actress and television personality
, Japanese painter
, Japanese artist
, Japanese voice actor

Japanese-language surnames